"I Can't Drive 55" is the lead single and first track from Sammy Hagar's eighth studio album VOA in 1984. Perpetuated by a very successful music video, it became a concert staple that continued throughout Hagar's tours as a member of Van Halen.

It is the 100th song on VH1's 100 Greatest Hard Rock Songs.

Song origin
Hagar wrote the song in response to receiving a speeding ticket in New York State, for driving  on a road with a  speed limit, which was the highest permissible speed limit in the United States at the time due to the National Maximum Speed Law enacted in 1974. Hagar said in 1994:

Music video
The song's music video was directed by Gil Bettman. The video was shot on location at the Saugus Speedway in Santa Clarita, California.

The song's video includes Hagar and his band being chased and jailed by the California Highway Patrol for traffic violations. The video shows Hagar driving a black Ferrari 512 BBi which is later tuned up by Hagar's mechanic, Claudio Zampolli. Zampolli was driving the Ferrari during the video's opening shot, where the Ferrari fish-tails across the speedway. Hagar claims in the commentary for the video on the DVD, The Long Road to Cabo that he burned out his clutch during the video. Hagar drove a 512, but a 308 was also used. Hagar claims it cost him $5800 to fix.

A trial scene is presided over by a judge played in a cameo appearance by John Kalodner. The judge's props were borrowed from director Robert Zemeckis, director of the 1980 film Used Cars. Sets were built and the video was shot during the summer. There was no air conditioning in the jailhouse set, so the cast and crew were hot.

The yellow jumpsuit, worn by Hagar in the video, can be seen at the New Orleans Hard Rock Cafe. A stuntman was used for Hagar's stunts. An exploding ramp was used to throw Hagar across the courtroom.

Track listing
"I Can't Drive 55" (Sammy Hagar) – 4:12
"Dick in the Dirt" (Sammy Hagar) – 4:19

Personnel 

 Sammy Hagar – lead vocals, lead guitar
 Gary Pihl – rhythm guitar, backing vocals
 Jesse Harms – keyboards, backing vocals
 Bill Church – bass guitar, backing vocals
 David Lauser – drums, backing vocals

Chart performance

Additional placements

The song has been a signature track for Hagar during and after his tenure with Van Halen, and is commonly used on TV programs and commercials related to automotive racing. 
Most recently, the song was featured in a NAPA Auto Parts commercial, where NASCAR drivers Michael Waltrip and teammate Dale Jarrett are asking Hagar to keep the noise down during a recording session; in response, Hagar asked Waltrip if he could drive faster. Waltrip's car number at the time of the 2007 commercial was No. 55 and he had failed to qualify for some races.
In 2001, NBC Sports had Hagar record a "corrected" version titled "I Can't Drive 65", reflecting the common  speed limit on freeways at that time (six years after the National Maximum Speed Law was repealed), for use during Budweiser Pole Award presentations on Winston Cup Series broadcasts on NBC and TNT. It was used from 2001 to 2003 during the broadcasts.
The accelerated version of the song was also available as a download for NHL Rivals 2004.
The song was the opening theme for ESPN's NASCAR coverage for the 2012 season.
The song is featured as a playable track in Guitar Hero On Tour: Decades and Guitar Hero Live.
"I Can't Drive 55" was an achievement and Easter egg found in Forza Motorsport 4 for driving a 1984 Ferrari GTO faster than 125 mph, in homage to the 1984 Ferrari 512 BBi used in the music video and the "Write me up for 125" line in the song.
The song is featured in an R4: Ridge Racer Type 4 US commercial.
The song is featured in the 1989 film Back to the Future Part II, when Marty McFly discovers he has returned to an alternate, hellish version of 1985 Hill Valley, replete with strip joints, pawn shops, and in the center of it all, a huge 27-story casino hotel called "Biff's Pleasure Paradise", featuring villain Biff Tannen's face. At other points of the film and in its predecessor, Marty goes back to the year 1955 by driving in a time machine in the form of a very fast car. 
The song is featured in the 1985 film Moving Violations when Scott Greeber and Stephanie McCarty borrow a car and go cruising at high speeds.
The song is on the soundtracks of NBA 2K18 and Twisted Metal.
The song is used in the 2018 film Bumblebee.
The song is played when Niklas Kronwall of the Detroit Red Wings and Noah Hanifin of the Calgary Flames score goals at home.
In 2021, Sammy Hagar performed this song live at the NASCAR All-Star Race at Texas Motor Speedway during the warmup lap before the race began.

Pop culture
The American punk rock band Minutemen named their album Double Nickels on the Dime as a protest against the song.

References

Further reading

Azerrad, Michael. Our Band Could Be Your Life: Scenes from the American Indie Underground, 1981–1991. Little Brown and Company, 2001. .

1984 singles
Sammy Hagar songs
Songs about cars
Songs written by Sammy Hagar
Song recordings produced by Ted Templeman
1984 songs
Geffen Records singles
Protest songs